Stéphane Charlin (born 30 August 2000) is a Swiss professional ice hockey goaltender who is currently playing with SCL Tigers of the National League (NL) on loan while under contract to Genève-Servette HC of the NL.

Playing career
Charlin won two consecutive Swiss championship titles with Genève-Servette HC U20 team in 2018 and 2019. Charlin started the 2019/20 season, his final junior season, with Geneva's U20 team for the third straight year. However, he was quickly loaned to Geneva's affiliate, HC Sierre of the Swiss League (SL) to make his professional debut. Charlin posted a 3.68 GAA with a .887 SVS% through 6 games when he was called up by Genève-Servette HC to replace injured backup, Gauthier Descloux.

On November 26, 2019, Charlin signed his first professional contract, agreeing to a two-year deal with Genève-Servette HC.

He unexpectedly made his National League (NL) debut on November 29, 2019 in a game against the ZSC Lions replacing Robert Mayer who had received a game misconduct for hitting Marcus Krüger with his blocker. Charlin went on to play 26 minutes allowing no goal in a 2-1 win. Mayer's game misconduct resulted in an automatic one game suspension, forcing Charlin to make his first NL start the next day at home against SC Bern. Charlin saved 30 of Bern's 32 shots, posting a 93.75 SVS% in a 2-1 loss for his first NL complete game. Charlin started his second NL game on February 22, 2020 against HC Ambrì-Piotta in which he recorded his first NL shutout in a 1-0 win.

On March 20, 2020, it was announced that Charlin, along with teammate Jesse Tanner, would be loaned to HC La Chaux-de-Fonds in the Swiss League for the 2020-21 season.

On February 3, 2021, Charlin was signed to an early two-year contract extension by Servette initially through the end of the 2023–24 season. On June 8, 2021, it was announced that Charlin would be loaned to SC Langenthal of the SL to begin the 2021–22 season.

International play
Charlin was named to Switzerland's U20 U18 national team for the 2020 World Junior Championships in the Czech Republic. He entered the tournament as Luca Hollenstein's  went on to win his only start against the Finns. He came on as a replacement to Hollenstein at the 30th minute against Sweden, posting a .938 SV% and a 1.98 GAA in 2 games.

References

External links

2000 births
SC Langenthal players
Living people
Genève-Servette HC players
SCL Tigers players
Swiss ice hockey goaltenders
Ice hockey people from Geneva